Frederick Hassan (1859 – 15 April 1940) was an Egyptian-born English cricketer who played in one first-class cricket match for Kent County Cricket Club in 1879. He was born in Cairo in 1859.

Hassan is known to have played for Erith in 1878 and played in one match for a Kent Colts side in May 1879 before playing his only first-class match in June of the same year against MCC at Lord's. He died at Tooting Bec in 1940 aged 81.

References

External links
 

1859 births
1940 deaths
English cricketers
Kent cricketers
Egyptian cricketers